Catherine Connors (born January 26, 1959) is an associate justice of the Maine Supreme Judicial Court.

Education 

Connors earned a Bachelor of Arts degree from Northwestern University in 1981 and a Juris Doctor from Northwestern University Pritzker School of Law in 1984.

Legal career 

She practiced at Pierce Atwood. Connors also filed an amicus brief in the U.S. Supreme Court in support of striking down the Defense of Marriage Act.

Maine Supreme Judicial Court service 

On January 6, 2020, Governor Janet Mills announced the nomination of Connors to the seat vacated by Jeffrey Hjelm. On January 30, 2020, her nomination was approved by the legislate judiciary committee by a 11–0 vote. On February 4, 2020, she was confirmed unanimously by the Maine Senate.

References 

1959 births
Living people
20th-century American lawyers
21st-century American lawyers
Maine lawyers
Justices of the Maine Supreme Judicial Court
Northwestern University alumni
Northwestern University Pritzker School of Law alumni
People from East Orange, New Jersey
20th-century American women lawyers
21st-century American women lawyers
21st-century American women judges
21st-century American judges